Ali Tayla (born 17 September 1949) is a Turkish fencer. He competed in the individual épée event at the 1972 Summer Olympics.

References

External links
 

1949 births
Living people
Turkish male épée fencers
Olympic fencers of Turkey
Fencers at the 1972 Summer Olympics